This is a list of fossiliferous stratigraphic units in Togo.



List of fossiliferous stratigraphic units

See also 
 Lists of fossiliferous stratigraphic units in Africa
 Geology of Togo

References

Further reading 
 A. K. Johnson, P. Rat, and J. Lang. 2000. Le bassin sedimentaire a phosphates du Togo (Maastrichtien-Eocene): stratigraphie, environments et evolution. Journal of African Earth Sciences 30(1):183-200

Togo
Fossil
Togo
Fossiliferous stratigraphic units
Fossil